In Norse mythology, Svafrþorinn is the father of Menglöð by an unnamed mother, and is attested solely in a stanza of Fjölsvinnsmál. As this is the only mention of the figure, further information has been theorized from the potential etymologies of the name Svafrþorinn and his relation to Menglöð.

Attestation
Svafrþorinn is attested in a stanza of the poem Fjölsvinnsmál, where Fjölsviðr tells Svipdagr that:

Theories
Menglöð has often been theorized as the goddess Freyja, and according to this theory, Svafrþorinn would therefore be the god Njörðr. The theory is complicated the etymology of the name Svafrþorinn (þorinn meaning "brave" and svafr means "gossip" (or possibly connects to sofa "sleep"), which Rudolf Simek says makes little sense when attempting to connect it to Njörðr. Simek says that "a more daring, but more meaningful" theory is that the poet took the notion of the Svefnþorn (Old Norse "sleeping thorn"), which appears as an element of some Legendary sagas, and the wall of fire that appears later in Fjölsvinnsmál from myths relating to Brynhildr found in Sigrdrífumál, the Prose Edda, and Völsunga saga, yet personifying the sleeping thorn due to the context.

Notes

References

 Bellows, Henry Adams (1936). The Poetic Edda: Translated from the Icelandic with an Introduction and Notes. Princeton University Press. American Scandinavian Foundation.
 Simek, Rudolf (2007) translated by Angela Hall. Dictionary of Northern Mythology. D.S. Brewer. 
 Thorpe, Benjamin (Trans.) (1907). The Elder Edda of Saemund Sigfusson. Norrœna Society.

Characters in Norse mythology
Freyja